Barnsole is a village in East Kent, England, between Canterbury and Deal. The population of the village is included in the civil parish of Wingham.

It once had a Baptist chapel, linked to the Eythorne Baptist Church "group".

References

External links

Villages in Kent
Dover District